The philosophy of technology is a sub-field of philosophy that studies the nature of technology and its social effects.

Philosophical discussion of questions relating to technology (or its Greek ancestor techne) dates back to the very dawn of Western philosophy.  The phrase "philosophy of technology" was first used in the late 19th century by German-born philosopher and geographer Ernst Kapp, who published a book titled Elements of a Philosophy of Technology (German title: Grundlinien einer Philosophie der Technik).

History

Greek philosophy 
The western term 'technology' comes from the Greek term techne (τέχνη) (art, or craft knowledge) and philosophical views on technology can be traced to the very roots of Western philosophy. A common theme in the Greek view of techne is that it arises as an imitation of nature (for example, weaving developed out of watching spiders). Greek philosophers such as Heraclitus and Democritus endorsed this view. In his Physics, Aristotle agreed that this imitation was often the case, but also argued that techne can go beyond nature and complete "what nature cannot bring to a finish." Aristotle also argued that nature (physis) and techne are ontologically distinct because natural things have an inner principle of generation and motion, as well as an inner teleological final cause. While techne is shaped by an outside cause and an outside telos (goal or end) which shapes it. Natural things strive for some end and reproduce themselves, while techne does not. In Plato's Timaeus, the world is depicted as being the work of a divine craftsman (Demiurge) who created the world in accordance with eternal forms as an artisan makes things using blueprints. Moreover, Plato argues in the Laws, that what a craftsman does is imitate this divine craftsman.

Middle ages to 19th century 

During the period of the Roman empire and late antiquity authors produced practical works such as Vitruvius' De Architectura (1st century BC) and Agricola's De Re Metallica (1556). Medieval Scholastic philosophy generally upheld the traditional view of technology as imitation of nature. During the Renaissance, Francis Bacon became one of the first modern authors to reflect on the impact of technology on society. In his utopian work New Atlantis (1627), Bacon put forth an optimistic worldview in which a fictional institution (Salomon's House) uses natural philosophy and technology to extend man's power over nature - for the betterment of society, through works which improve living conditions. The goal of this fictional foundation is "...the knowledge of causes, and secret motions of things; and the enlarging of the bounds of human empire, to the effecting of all things possible".

19th century 

The native German philosopher and geographer Ernst Kapp, who was based in Texas, published the fundamental book "Grundlinien einer Philosophie der Technik" in 1877. Kapp was deeply inspired by the philosophy of Hegel and regarded technique as a projection of human organs. In the European context, Kapp is referred to as the founder of the philosophy of technology.

Another, more materialistic position on technology which became very influential in the 20th-century philosophy of technology was centered on the ideas of Benjamin Franklin and Karl Marx.

20th century to present 

Five early prominent 20th-century philosophers to directly address the effects of modern technology on humanity were John Dewey, Martin Heidegger, Herbert Marcuse, Günther Anders and Hannah Arendt. They all saw technology as central to modern life, although Heidegger, Anders, Arendt and Marcuse were more ambivalent and critical than Dewey. The problem for Heidegger was the hidden nature of technology's essence, Gestell or Enframing which posed for humans what he called its greatest danger and thus its greatest possibility. Heidegger's major work on technology is found in The Question Concerning Technology.

While a number of important individual works were published in the second half of the twentieth century, Paul Durbin has identified two books published at the turn of the century as marking the development of the philosophy of technology as an academic subdiscipline with canonical texts. Those were Technology and the Good Life (2000), edited by Eric Higgs, Andrew Light, and David Strong and American Philosophy of Technology (2001) by Hans Achterhuis. Several collected volumes with topics in philosophy of technology have come out over the past decade and the journals Techne: Research in Philosophy and Technology (the journal of the Society for Philosophy and Technology, published by the Philosophy Documentation Center) and Philosophy & Technology (Springer) publish exclusively works in philosophy of technology. Philosophers of technology reflect broadly and work in the area and include interest on diverse topics of geoengineering, internet data and privacy, our understandings of internet cats, technological function and epistemology of technology, computer ethics, biotechnology and its implications, transcendence in space, and technological ethics more broadly.

Bernard Stiegler argued in his Technics and Time, as well as in his other works, that the question of technology has been repressed (in the sense of Freud) by the history of philosophy. Instead, Stiegler showed how the question of technology constitutes the fundamental question of philosophy. Stiegler shows, for example in Plato's Meno, that technology is that which makes anamnesis, namely the access to truth, possible. Stiegler's deconstruction of the history of philosophy through technology as the supplement opens a different path to understand the place of technology in philosophy than the established field of philosophy of technology. In the same vein, philosophers - such as Alexander Galloway, Eugene Thacker, and McKenzie Wark in their book Excommunication - argue that advances in and the pervasiveness of digital technologies transform the philosophy of technology into a new 'first philosophy'. Citing examples such as the analysis of writing and speech in Plato's dialogue The Phaedrus, Galloway et al. suggest that instead of considering technology as a secondary to ontology, technology be understood as prior to the very possibility of philosophy: "Does everything that exists, exist to me presented and represented, to be mediated and remediated, to be communicated and translated? There are mediative situations in which heresy, exile, or banishment carry the day, not repetition, communion, or integration. There are certain kinds of messages that state 'there will be no more messages'. Hence for every communication there is a correlative excommunication."

There has been additional reflection focusing on the philosophy of engineering, as a sub-field within philosophy of technology. Ibo van de Poel and David E. Goldberg edited a volume, Philosophy and Engineering: An Emerging Agenda (2010) contains a number of research articles focused on design, epistemology, ontology and ethics in engineering.

Technology and neutrality

Technological determinism is the idea that "features of technology [determine] its use and the role of a progressive society was to adapt to [and benefit from] technological change." The alternative perspective would be social determinism which looks upon society being at fault for the "development and deployment" of technologies. Lelia Green used recent gun massacres such as the Port Arthur Massacre and the Dunblane Massacre to selectively show technological determinism and social determinism. According to Green, a technology can be thought of as a neutral entity only when the sociocultural context and issues circulating the specific technology are removed. It will be then visible to us that there lies a relationship of social groups and power provided through the possession of technologies. A compatibilist position between these two positions is the interactional stance on technology proposed by Batya Friedman that states that social forces and technology co-construct and co-vary with one another.

References

External links

Journals
Philosophy & Technology
Ethics and Information Technology
Techné: Research in Philosophy and Technology
International Journal of Technoethics
Technology in Society
Science and Engineering Ethics

Websites

Institute of Philosophy and Technology
Society for Philosophy and Technology
Essays on the Philosophy of Technology compiled by Frank Edler
Filozofia techniki: problematyka, nurty, trudności Rafal Lizut

Study programmes
MA programme Philosophy of Science, Technology, and Society at the University of Twente in the Netherlands

 
Science and technology studies
Media studies